Yashwantrao Chavan formed his second ministry as Chief Minister of Maharashtra on 8 March 1962, after leading his Indian National Congress to a majority in 1962 Maharashtra Legislative Assembly election. He demitted office in November 1962, having been appointed Minister of Defence by Prime Minister Jawaharlal Nehru. He was succeeded by his buildings and communication minister, Marotrao Kannamwar.

List of ministers
The Second Chavan ministry consisted of 31 members: Chavan, 16 cabinet ministers, and 14 deputy ministers. The regions of Maharashtra were represented as follows:

Cabinet ministers

Deputy ministers
 G. D. Patil
 M. N. Kailas
 Yashwantrao Mohite
 Narendra Tidke
 Madhusudan Vairale
 Rajaram A. Patil
 H. G. Vartak
 B. J. Khatal
 Rafiq Zakaria
 D. K. Khanvilkar
 S. L. Kadam
 N. S. Patil
 Shankarrao Bajirao Patil
 Kalyanrao P. Patil

References

Indian National Congress
C
C
Cabinets established in 1962
Cabinets disestablished in 1962